This article lists notable compositions within the viola repertoire. The list includes works in which the viola is a featured instrument (i.e., viola solos, concertos, viola and piano duos, etc.).  The list is ordered by composer surname.

A
 Julia Adolphe (born 1988)
     Unearth, Release (2016)
 Kurt Atterberg (1887–1974)
     Sonata in B minor for cello (or violin, or viola, or horn) and piano, Op. 27 (1925)

B 
 Johann Sebastian Bach (1685–1750)
     Brandenburg Concerto No. 6 in B-flat major, BWV 1051 (1721)
 Béla Bartók (1881–1945)
     Concerto for viola and orchestra in A minor, Sz. 120, BB128 (1945); completed in 1949 by Tibor Serly
 Ludwig van Beethoven (1770–1827)
     Serenade in D major for flute, violin and viola, Op. 25 (1795)
 Luciano Berio (1925–2003)
     Sequenza VI for solo viola (1967)
 Hector Berlioz (1803–1869)
     Harold en Italie, symphony for orchestra with viola obbligato, Op. 16, H. 68 (1834)
 Ernest Bloch (1880–1959)
     Suite Hébraïque for viola and piano or orchestra (1951)
 Johannes Brahms (1833–1897)
     Sonata No. 1 in F minor for viola and piano, Op. 120 No. 1 (1894)
     Sonata No. 2 in E-flat major for viola and piano, Op. 120 No. 2 (1894)
     Two Songs for voice, viola and piano, Op. 91 (1884)
 Max Bruch (1838–1920)
     Concerto for Clarinet, Viola, and Orchestra, Op. 88 (1911)

C
 Rebecca Clarke (1886–1979)
     Morpheus for viola and piano (1917)
     Sonata for viola and piano (1919)

D
Claude Debussy (1862–1918)
     Sonata for flute, viola and harp, L. 137 (1915)

E
 Edward Elgar (1857–1934)
     Canto Popolare for viola and piano (1904)

G
 Morton Gould (1913–1996)
     Concerto for viola and orchestra (1943)

H
 Jennifer Higdon (b. 1962)
     Concerto for viola and orchestra (2015)
 Paul Hindemith (1895–1963)
     Sonata in F for viola and piano, Op. 11 No. 4 (1919)
     Kammermusik No. 5 for viola and chamber orchestra, Op. 36 No. 4 (1927)
     Der Schwanendreher for viola and small orchestra (1935)
     Trauermusik for viola and orchestra (1936)

L
 Peter Lieberson (1946–2011)
     Concerto for viola and orchestra (1992)
 György Ligeti (1923–2006)
     Viola sonata for solo viola (1994)

M
 James MacMillan (b. 1959)
     Concerto for viola and orchestra (2013)
 Felix Mendelssohn (1809–1847)
     Viola sonata in C minor, MWV Q 14 (1824)
 Wolfgang Amadeus Mozart (1756–1791)
     Sinfonia Concertante in E-flat major for violin, viola and orchestra, K. 364 (K. 320d) (1779)
     Duo No. 1 in G major for violin and viola, K. 423 (1783)
     Duo No. 2 in B-flat major for violin and viola, K. 424 (1783)
     Kegelstatt Trio in E-flat major for clarinet, viola and piano, K. 498 (1786)
 Nico Muhly (b. 1981)
     Concerto for viola and orchestra (2014)

P
 Walter Piston (1894–1976)
     Concerto for viola and orchestra (1957)

S
 Alfred Schnittke (1934–1998)
     Concerto for viola and orchestra (1985)
 Robert Schumann (1810–1856)
     Märchenbilder for viola and piano, Op. 113 (1851)
     Märchenerzählungen for clarinet, viola and piano, Op. 132 (1853)
 Dmitri Shostakovich (1906–1975)
     Sonata for viola and piano, Op. 147 (1975)
 Carl Stamitz (1745–1801)
     Concerto for viola in D major, Op. 1 (c. 1774)

T
 Tōru Takemitsu (1930–1996)
     A String around Autumn for viola and orchestra (1989)
 Georg Philipp Telemann (1681–1767)
     Concerto in G Major for viola and orchestra, TWV 51:G9
     Concerto in G major for 2 violas and string orchestra, TWV 52:G3

V
 Henri Vieuxtemps (1820–1881)
     Sonata in B-flat major for viola and piano, Op. 36 (1862)

W
 Ralph Vaughan Williams (1972–1958)
     Flos Campi for viola, wordless chorus, and small orchestra (1925)
     Four Hymns for tenor, viola, and string orchestra (1914)
     Romance for viola and piano (c. 1914)
     Six Studies in English Folk Song for cello or viola and piano (1926)
     Suite for viola and small orchestra (1933–1934)
 William Walton (1902–1983)
     Viola Concerto in A minor (1928–1929)
 Graham Waterhouse (b. 1962)
     Four Epigraphs after Escher, Op. 35, for viola, heckelphone and piano (1993)
     Sonata ebraica for viola and piano (2013)
 John Woolrich (b. 1954)
     Ulysses Awakes for viola and ten strings (1989)

References

Further reading 

 Barrett, B. M., Barrett H. (1996). The Viola: Complete Guide for Teachers and Students. University of Alabama Press. . .
 Bynog, David (2020). Notes for Violists: A Guide to the Repertoire. Oxford University Press. . .
 White, Katie (2014). A Pedagogical Introduction: Viola Repertoire from 1986-2013. (DMA dissertation). University of Oregon.
 Warmath, Jordan (2016). The Contemporary Revolution—Evolution of Viola Repertoire. (DMA dissertation). University of California. .

External links 
 List of Compositions Featuring the Viola at the International Music Score Library Project
 Directory of Works compiled by Music4Viola

Classical music lists